South Qilianshan Road is a station on Line 13 of the Shanghai Metro. It is located in Putuo District, Shanghai.

Although service did not include mobile or Wi-Fi signals, the metro did provide stops to five stations in Jiading District. However, this opening did not include the South Qilianshan Road or Daduhe Road stations which were located on that branch of the line. The South Qilianshan Road station opened on June 15, 2013.

References 

Railway stations in Shanghai
Shanghai Metro stations in Putuo District
Railway stations in China opened in 2013
Line 13, Shanghai Metro